Sizy Bugor is a rural locality (a selo) and the administrative center of Sizobugorsky Selsoviet of Volodarsky District, Astrakhan Oblast, Russia. The population was 1,582 as of 2010. There are 3 streets.

Geography 
Sizy Bugor is located on the Bushma River, 26 km south of Volodarsky (the district's administrative centre) by road. Tumak is the nearest rural locality.

References 

Rural localities in Volodarsky District, Astrakhan Oblast